Lamproclytus oakleyi is a species of beetle in the family Cerambycidae. It was described by Fisher in 1935.

References

Tillomorphini
Beetles described in 1935